Cory is a given name and a surname.

Cory may also refer to:

Places in the United States
Cory, Colorado, an unincorporated town
Cory, Indiana, an unincorporated town

Other uses
Corydoras ("cory"), a kind of freshwater catfish
Cory (company), a waste management company

See also
Cory Band, a Welsh brass band
Corey (disambiguation)
Corry (disambiguation)
Corrie (disambiguation)
Kory (disambiguation)

ja:コーリー